Compañía de Filipinas was a cargo steamship that was built in Scotland in 1890 for the Compañía General de Tabacos de Filipinas (CGTF). In the Philippine–American War the Navy of the First Philippine Republic armed her as its flagship and renamed her Filipinas. After that war she reverted to her original name and commercial service. In the Second World War, Japanese forces captured her and renamed her Hoei Maru. She was sunk in July 1945, shortly before the end of the war.

Building
Lobnitz & Co built the ship in Renfrew, Scotland as yard number 342, launching her in 1 July 1890. She had a single screw, driven by a three-cylinder triple-expansion steam engine that was rated at 88 NHP. CGTF registered her at Manila. Her code letters were MBOG.

Flagship Filipinas
In 1898, while she was inter-island service, the Revolutionary Navy (later the Philippine Navy) took over the ship as its flagship. The Revolutionary Navy initially consisted of a small fleet of eight captured Spanish steam launches refitted with Gonzalez Hontoria de 9 cm (mod 1879) guns, and then received a donation of five merchant ships, namely the Taaleño, the Balayan, the Bulusan, the Taal and the Purísima Concepción, before acquiring Filipinas. The acquisition was made possible by the Filipino crew of the ship, who mutinied under the Cuban Vicente Catalan, who proclaimed himself "admiral". When the Filipino flag was raised on the ship, the East Asia Squadron contested it and claimed the ship for Germany. Despite an impending naval incident, the ship remained under Filipino control until the Philippine–American War proved the naval superiority of the American Asiatic Squadron and decimated the Revolutionary Navy. After the US conquest of the Philippines, the ship was returned to CGTF and resumed her original name and commercial service.

Hoei Maru
During the Philippines campaign in the Second World War, Japanese forces captured Compania de Filipinas off Fortune Island in 1942. She was taken into Japanese Government service and renamed . On 3 July 1945 a aerial mine sank her near Jindo Island.

This was the only Hoei Maru that was a cargo ship, but there were other Japanese vessels with the same name:
Hoei Maru No. 2 (tanker), sunk by a mine on 10 September 1944
Hoei Maru (minesweeper), sunk by torpedo on 29 September 1944
Hoei Maru No. 3 (tanker), sunk by aircraft on 21 January 1945
Hoei Maru No. 5 (tanker), sunk by aircraft on 6 May 1945

References

1890 ships
Maritime incidents in July 1945
Merchant ships of Spain
Naval ships of the Philippines
Ships built on the River Clyde
Steamships of Japan
Steamships of Spain
Ships sunk by mines